Eliseo Castillo (born April 29, 1975) is a Cuban former professional boxer who competed from 1996 to 2009, holding the NABO cruiserweight title in 2006. He is the younger brother of Heavyweight boxer Elieser Castillo.

Amateur career
From the ages of 12 through 16, he trained to box through the Cuban state government's amateur boxing program. (This is the same program that produced such boxing legends as Teofilo Stevenson, Félix Savón, Joel Casamayor, and Juan Carlos Gomez.) Despite winning the vast majority of his approximately 90 amateur bouts in Cuba, the young fighter could not manage to capture an international title.

Defection from Cuba
At the age of 17, Eliseo Castillo escaped from Cuba on a raft with his brothers Elieser (a very well known fellow Heavyweight boxer) and Eliades and two other friends. The group spent five days at sea before they drifted ashore in Panama. Soon thereafter, they were returned to Guantanamo Bay. After 18 months of processing the group was allowed to emigrate to the United States. He then moved to Miami, Florida.

Professional career
At the age of 20, he began his professional career as a boxer. His first bout was against Anthony Mack (who was also making his professional debut that evening) on February 24, 1996. Castillo won the bout via first round knockout. He fought off-and-on into the new millennium, at one time even taking 3 years off from the sport.

Though his career has been spotty, he still managed to remain undefeated up until April 2005. The only blemish on his record up until that point was a draw to Terry Pitts (who later changed his name to Sajad Abdul Aziz) on November 13, 1998 at the famed Mahi Shrine Temple Auditorium in Miami. Aziz was able to score knockdowns in both the 4th and 5th rounds, but Castillo fought back and secured a majority draw. These fights were at cruiserweight.

His biggest victory came on July 3, 2004 against former Heavyweight champion Michael Moorer at the American Airlines Arena in Miami. He beat the former champion by a unanimous decision in their 10-round bout. This brought him some level of attention from the boxing press and garnered for him a fight with Wladimir Klitschko the following year.

At 2:51 in the fourth round, Klitschko was declared the victor after referee Daniel Van de Wiele stopped the fight.

Shortly after the fight with Klitschko, Castillo moved back down to the Cruiserweight division. He has won two straight since the Klitschko loss and was KOd by, the then undefeated, Johnathon Banks on July 26, 2006.

Professional boxing record

|-
|align="center" colspan=8|20 Wins (15 knockouts, 5 decisions), 3 Losses (3 knockouts, 0 decisions), 1 Draw 
|-
| align="center" style="border-style: none none solid solid; background: #e3e3e3"|Result
| align="center" style="border-style: none none solid solid; background: #e3e3e3"|Record
| align="center" style="border-style: none none solid solid; background: #e3e3e3"|Opponent
| align="center" style="border-style: none none solid solid; background: #e3e3e3"|Type
| align="center" style="border-style: none none solid solid; background: #e3e3e3"|Round
| align="center" style="border-style: none none solid solid; background: #e3e3e3"|Date
| align="center" style="border-style: none none solid solid; background: #e3e3e3"|Location
| align="center" style="border-style: none none solid solid; background: #e3e3e3"|Notes
|-align=center
|Loss
|
|align=left| Denis Lebedev
|TKO
|5
|22/03/2009
|align=left| Balashikha, Russia
|align=left|
|-
|Loss
|
|align=left| Johnathon Banks
|KO
|4
|26/07/2006
|align=left| New York City, U.S.
|align=left|
|-
|Win
|
|align=left| Willie Herring
|UD
|12
|24/03/2006
|align=left| Miami, Florida, U.S.
|align=left|
|-
|Win
|
|align=left| Chris Lewallen
|TKO
|1
|25/02/2006
|align=left| Oklahoma City, Oklahoma, U.S.
|align=left|
|-
|Loss
|
|align=left| Wladimir Klitschko
|TKO
|4
|23/04/2005
|align=left| Dortmund, Germany
|align=left|
|-
|Win
|
|align=left| Michael Moorer
|UD
|10
|03/07/2004
|align=left| Miami, Florida, U.S.
|align=left|
|-
|Win
|
|align=left| Drexie James
|KO
|1
|01/05/2004
|align=left| Miami, Florida, U.S.
|align=left|
|-
|Win
|
|align=left| Curtis Taylor
|KO
|3
|26/03/2004
|align=left| Miami, Florida, U.S.
|align=left|
|-
|Win
|
|align=left| Onebo Maxime
|UD
|4
|16/01/2004
|align=left| Minneapolis, Minnesota, U.S.
|align=left|
|-
|Win
|
|align=left| Ronnie Smith
|UD
|4
|13/10/2002
|align=left| Choctaw, Mississippi, U.S.
|align=left|
|-
|Win
|
|align=left| Bill Medei
|TKO
|1
|22/06/2002
|align=left| United States Virgin Islands
|align=left|
|-
|Win
|
|align=left| Agustin Corpus
|TKO
|5
|07/08/1999
|align=left| Miami, Florida, U.S.
|align=left|
|-
|Draw
|
|align=left| Sajad Abdul Aziz
|PTS
|10
|13/11/1998
|align=left| Miami, Florida, U.S.
|align=left|
|-
|Win
|
|align=left| Tyrone Armstead
|TKO
|5
|07/06/1998
|align=left| Miami, Florida, U.S.
|align=left|
|-
|Win
|
|align=left| Ed Mosley
|TKO
|4
|02/05/1998
|align=left| Miami, Florida, U.S.
|align=left|
|-
|Win
|
|align=left| Jerry Brown
|TKO
|2
|20/12/1997
|align=left| Miami, Florida, U.S.
|align=left|
|-
|Win
|
|align=left| Oscar Silva
|KO
|1
|22/08/1997
|align=left| Miami Beach, Florida, U.S.
|align=left|
|-
|Win
|
|align=left| Berry Butler
|UD
|4
|24/01/1997
|align=left| Atlantic City, New Jersey, U.S.
|align=left|
|-
|Win
|
|align=left| Jesus Carlos Velez
|TKO
|3
|03/01/1997
|align=left| Hialeah, Florida, U.S.
|align=left|
|-
|Win
|
|align=left| George Holder
|TKO
|2
|27/09/1996
|align=left| Atlantic City, New Jersey, U.S.
|align=left|
|-
|Win
|
|align=left| Alphonzo Davis
|TKO
|3
|10/08/1996
|align=left| Las Vegas, Nevada, U.S.
|align=left|
|-
|Win
|
|align=left| Aurelio Dos Santos
|KO
|1
|29/07/1996
|align=left| Hallandale, Florida, U.S.
|align=left|
|-
|Win
|
|align=left| Luis Yampier
|TKO
|1
|25/05/1996
|align=left| Miami Beach, Florida, U.S.
|align=left|
|-
|Win
|
|align=left| Anthony Mack
|TKO
|1
|24/02/1996
|align=left| Miami Beach, Florida, U.S.
|align=left|
|}

External links
 

1975 births
Living people
Cuban male boxers
Boxers from Havana
Cruiserweight boxers